Toni Lynn Washington (born Dorothy Helen Leak, December 6, 1937, Southern Pines, North Carolina) is an American blues singer.

Musical career
She took to music at an early age, singing with her school and church choirs.

She has had seven Blues Music Award nominations.  Washington received the 1999 Boston Blues Festival Lifetime Achievement Award. In 2003 she released her fourth CD since 1997, and her first on the NorthernBlues label.

Albums
Blues at Midnight (1995, Tone-Cool Records, a Rounder Records subsidiary)
It's My Turn Now (1997, Tone-Cool Records)
Good Things (2000, Tone-Cool Records)
Been So Long (2003, NorthernBlues Music)

Main band members
Keyboards: Bruce Bears
Guitar: Duke Robillard, Kevin Belz, and Mike Null
Saxophone: Chuck Langford, Gordon Beadle, and Doug James
Trumpet: Scott Aruda
Drums: Dave Jamrog and Mark Texeira
Bass: Jesse Williams, Sven Larson and Steve Cuoco
Record producer: Duke Robillard and Bruce Bears

Blues Music Award nominations 
2003, 2004 and 2005 "Soul-Blues Female Performer of the Year"
Her previous albums for "Album of the Year"

References

External links
 Official website

1937 births
Living people
American blues singers
American women singers
People from Southern Pines, North Carolina
21st-century American women